Albert Berley Shealy (May 24, 1900 – March 7, 1967), was a professional baseball pitcher.

External links

1900 births
1967 deaths
Major League Baseball pitchers
Baseball players from South Carolina
New York Yankees players
Chicago Cubs players
Kinston Eagles players
St. Paul Saints (AA) players
Los Angeles Angels (minor league) players
Newberry Wolves baseball players
Nashville Vols players
Reading Keystones players
Albany Senators players
Kansas City Blues (baseball) players
Tulsa Oilers (baseball) players
Fort Worth Cats players
Portland Beavers players
Oklahoma City Indians players
Dallas Rebels players
People from Chapin, South Carolina